The eighteenth series of the British television drama series Grange Hill began broadcasting on 3 January 1995, before ending on 10 March 1995 on BBC One. The series follows the lives of the staff and pupils of the eponymous school, an inner-city London comprehensive school. It consists of twenty episodes.

Cast

Pupils

Teachers

Others

Episodes

DVD release
The eighteenth series of Grange Hill has never been released on DVD as of 2015.

Notes

References

1995 British television seasons
Grange Hill